Mustilia castanea is a moth in the family Endromidae. It was described by Frederic Moore in 1879. It is found in Bhutan and Darjeeling, India.

References

Moths described in 1879
Mustilia